Zach Rey (born March 27, 1989) in Bethlehem, Pennsylvania) is an American wrestler for Lehigh Valley Athletic Club who represented the United States at the 2015 World Wrestling Championships.

High school
Rey attended Hopatcong High School in Hopatcong, New Jersey, from 2003-2007, where he was a three-time place winner in the NJSIAA tournament, winning state titles in 2006 and 2007. Rey was also an all-state football player his senior year.

College
At Lehigh University, Rey was a four-time NCAA qualifier and three-time NCAA placer, finishing third in 2010, second in 2012, and winning an NCAA championship as a junior in 2011. Rey finished his college career with 120 wins and 15 losses for a winning percentage of 89%.

International
While in college, Rey represented the United States at the 2010 University World Championships, where he finished in 8th place with a 1-1 record. Rey has since gone on to success at the Senior level, making three freestyle national teams (top 3 in the World Team/Olympic trials). Notable tournaments won include twice winning the Pan American Championships (2013/2014), the Pan American Games (2015), the Dave Schultz Memorial (2013), and the Cerro Pelado International (2014/2015).

In 2015, after losing in the finals at the World Team Trials, Rey was awarded the opportunity to compete in the 2015 World Wrestling Championships after World Team Trials winner Tervel Dlagnev was forced to miss competition due to injury. Rey went on to finish 0-1 at the championships.

References

1989 births
Living people
Lehigh University alumni
Medalists at the 2015 Pan American Games
American male sport wrestlers
Pan American Games gold medalists for the United States
Pan American Games medalists in wrestling
Sportspeople from Bethlehem, Pennsylvania
Wrestlers at the 2015 Pan American Games